Badai Pasti Berlalu is the 1977 soundtrack to the Indonesian film  of the same name. Rolling Stone Indonesia listed it as the best Indonesian album of all time. Three of its songs, Badai Pasti Berlalu, Merpati Putih, and Merepih Alam, were listed by Rolling Stone as among the best Indonesian songs ever released.

Recording and release
After the success of Badai Pasti Berlalu, Eros Djarot and Chrisye were approached by Irama Mas with a request to release the soundtrack as an album, offering to buy it for a flat fee. Although they considered their work on Badai Pasti Berlalu over and were already considering their next project, they agreed.

Badai Pasti Berlalu was recorded in Pluit, Jakarta in a period of 21 days, led by composer Eros Djarot. The vocals were covered by Chrisye (who also played the bass) and Berlian Hutauruk, with Fariz Rustam Munaf and Keenan Nasution on the drums, Debby Nasution on the keyboard, and Yockie Suryoprajogo on both the keyboard and drums.

It was released in 1977 with a picture of Badai Pasti Berlalu actress Christine Hakim on the cover. After stagnating for a week, numerous radio stations began playing the singles and sales increased exponentially.

Track listing

Reception
Although it was originally feared that only die-hard fans would buy a film soundtrack album, Badai Pasti Berlalu sold well and was critically acclaimed; it was called "monumental."

Legacy
Badai Pasti Berlalu has been called "the start of Indonesian pop" and "the blueprint for Indonesian pop development". It also convinced Amin Widjaja of Musica Studios to sign Chrisye, launching Chrisye's music career.

Rolling Stone Indonesia listed Badai Pasti Berlalu as the best Indonesian album of all time.

Three of the songs included on Badai Pasti Berlalu were listed by Rolling Stone Indonesia as some of the best Indonesian songs of all time. "Badai Pasti Berlalu" was ranked third, "Merpati Putih" was ranked forty-third, and "Merepih Alam" was ranked ninetieth.

1999 remake

Badai Pasti Berlalu was remade in 1999 by Chrisye, with the songs rearranged by Erwin Gutawa. It cost 800 million Rupiah (US$95,000) to produce and promote, which it made within three months.

References

Drama film soundtracks
1977 soundtrack albums
Indonesian-language albums
Pop albums by Indonesian artists